Arabidze is a Georgian surname that means "Son of Arab". Notable people with the surname include:

 Giorgi Arabidze (born 1998), Georgian football player
 Meri Arabidze (born 1994), Georgian chess player

Georgian-language surnames